Sgt. Carter, Sergeant Carter or variations thereof may refer to:

Gunnery Sergeant Vince Carter, a character from Gomer Pyle, U.S.M.C.
Technical Sergeant Andrew Carter, a character from Hogan's Heroes